The Copa Libertadores 1993 was the 34th edition of the Copa Libertadores, CONMEBOL's annual international club tournament. São Paulo won the competition.

The participating teams were divided into five groups, in which teams of the same country were placed in the same group. Each country was represented by two teams. The countries were paired as follows:

Group 1:  Perú and  Venezuela
Group 2:  Chile and  Bolivia
Group 3:  Uruguay and  Ecuador
Group 4:  Brazil and  Colombia
Group 5:  Paraguay and  Argentina

Qualified teams

Group stage

Group 1

Group 2

Group 3

Group 4

Group 5

Final stages

Seeding

Bracket

Round of 16

Quarter-finals

Semi-finals

Finals

Champions

Top scorers

References

External links
Match results at CONMEBOL's website (In Spanish)
In English
Match result at RSSSF's website

1
Copa Libertadores seasons